Overtourism is the congestion or overcrowding from an excess of tourists, resulting in conflicts with locals.  The World Tourism Organization (UNWTO) defines overtourism as "the impact of tourism on a destination, or parts thereof, that excessively influences perceived quality of life of citizens and/or quality of visitor experiences in a negative way". This definition shows how overtourism can be observed both among locals, who view tourism as a disruptive factor that increasingly burdens daily life, as well as visitors, who may regard high numbers of tourists as a nuisance.

The term has only been used frequently since 2015, but is now the most commonly used expression to describe the negative impacts ascribed to tourism.

Characterisation

In 2018, CNN characterised overtourism as a "tourism backlash" in popular destinations, discussing multiple areas that were actively seeking to limit tourism.

The growth of tourism can lead to conflicts over the use of space between residents, commuters, day-visitors and overnight tourists. Although much attention is currently given to overtourism in cities, it can also be observed in rural destinations, or on islands.

Overtourism is related to the carrying capacity of a destination and to overcrowding, when too many people visit a specific place for safety or comfort.

Overtourism is sometimes incorrectly equated with mass tourism. Mass tourism entails large groups of tourists coming to the same destination. While this can lead to overtourism, there are many destinations that host millions of visitors, yet are not seen as suffering from overtourism (e.g., London). Overtourism is not caused just by overnight tourism visitors. In Amsterdam, for example, the second-largest group of visitors come from nearby areas who visit the city just for the day.

Causes 
As early as the late 1970s, three main issues related to excessive tourism growth were recognized: (1) Too many visitors; (2) Too much disturbance (e.g., noise); (3) Too many physical impacts (e.g., touristification and destruction of nature). Overtourism is observed mostly, but not exclusively, when the number of visitors to a destination, or parts thereof, grows rapidly in a short space of time. Also, it is most common in areas where visitors and residents share a physical space.

In recent years, developments within tourism and outside of tourism have increased contact between residents and visitors and made the impacts of tourism more noticeable. In addition to the overall growth of tourist numbers, problems associated with overtourism have been exacerbated by the following developments:

Tourism developments 
 Low-cost airlines: The low fares of the low-cost airlines have made it easier for more people to travel more often
 Cruises: Cruise tourism is growing rapidly [10]. Particularly in popular, but relatively small tourism destinations (e.g., Dubrovnik or Orkney), cruises can cause overtourism, when large numbers of tourists all come to visit a city at the same time. 
 Airbnb: Airbnb and similar online accommodation services can lead to an increase in tourists due to lower prices (compared to hotels or other establishments), often simpler booking procedures and a wider choice of accommodation, mostly private apartments or houses. 
 Social media: The increased ease of communication through social media means that previously undiscovered places can suddenly become very popular, particularly when promoted by influencers on platforms like Instagram.  When they use the geotag feature, people are able to see the exact coordinates of the location with a click of a button. This social-media effect can compound the increased tourism traffic that often arises from revamped marketing campaigns for regional destinations. (Such tourism campaigns are often initiated by government agencies.  Often the goal is to revitalize an area after a downturn in the local economy has occurred.)
Population growth: In the last 50 years, the world's population has more than doubled. This means that the market is larger.
Increased urbanization: In the last 60 years, the population in urban areas has grown at a never before seen rate.

Developments outside of tourism 
 Growth of host population and commuters: Particularly in city destinations, the number of residents and commuters has risen rapidly in recent years, which has led to increased pressure on infrastructure and facilities and a heightened sense of crowding.
 Experience economy and changing lifestyle patterns: the increased use of leisure facilities by residents has contributed to a monoculture of hospitality facilities and has increased the likelihood that residents and visitors share the same spaces.
 Speculation on the housing market: speculation on the housing market can also create a shortage of housing for residents and increase rents and house prices.
 Online shopping: The impact of online shopping is twofold: it has made it more difficult for retailers to sell enough to pay for the high rents in popular destinations, while it has increased the number of transport vehicles that stop to deliver goods in city centres and suburban areas, contributing to congestion.
 Social media: Residents have found it easier to unite due to the rise of social media, which has made it possible for them to become better organized in voicing their concerns regarding tourism impacts.

Examples 

Several media outlets have published lists of destinations that are not recommended because of an excessive number of tourists.

Antarctica 
According to CNN, environmentalists are concerned about the effect of tourism on Antarctica, which steadily increased during the 2010s.

Austria 
Hallstatt, in 2020 had 780 citizens and more than 10,000 visitors a day, primarily arriving via tour bus, stopping briefly for photographs, and moving on quickly. The town in 2020 implented a new system to limit entry of buses.

Bhutan 
Bhutan instituted a US$200 to US$250 charge per day for tourists because of overtourism concerns.

China 
The Great Wall of China has been damaged by overtourism.

Croatia 
Dubrovnik became so overtouristed by 2017 that UNESCO considered removing it from the World Heritage Site list. The city capped the number of visitors allowed to climb its ramparts and as of 2017 was planning to limit the number of cruise ships that could dock. In 2020 they were considering limiting the number of new restaurants allowed to open.

Ecuador 
The Galápagos Islands were included on Fodor's 2017 list of places not to go because of environmental damage caused by overtourism. As of 2017 visitors are required to hire a guide.

France 

In Paris, workers at the Louvre went on strike over what they said were dangerously overcrowded conditions.

Greece 
In Santorini, cruise ship visitors have been capped at 8000 per day due to overtourism after years in which the island of 15,000 residents was receiving up to 18,000 tourists per day.

Hawai'i 
In Hawaii, the degredation of corals has been shown to worsen in areas with higher concentration of tourists.

Iceland 
The Fjaðrárgljúfur area was closed after the music video for Justin Bieber's I'll Show You made it so popular the government needed to improve infrastructure.

India 
In 2019, the Taj Mahal started fining visitors who stay more than three hours. CNN in 2017 called the crowds "relentless."

Indonesia 
Bali was, in 2020, planning a US$10 tourist tax.

Italy 
Venice has faced declining population because of overtourism. In 2019 Forbes called it one of the "most notably overtouristed destinations" in the world. CNN in 2017 called the crowds "overbearing." The city in 2018 tested the use of turnstiles in St. Mark's Square to control the number of visitors. In 2020 the daily tourist tax was US$11.

Capri in 2018 tested ways to limit day tourism. Cinque Terre had 2.5 million visitors in 2015, and local authorities sought to limit visitors to 1.5 million in 2016, but a backlash resulted in this being walked back. CNN in 2017 said that day tourists from cruise ships, who tour for a few hours and don't spend money, are blamed for environmental damage. Officials in Rome made it illegal to sit on the Spanish Steps, with fines of up to US$448, due to damage caused by tourists.

Japan 
Kyoto officials as of 2019 had instituted a US$92 fine for tourists taking photographs of geishas without their permission.

Nepal 
Mount Everest has become so overtouristed that climbers die of altitude sickness because of the delays caused by overcrowding. As of 2020 the Nepalese government was planning to limit permits to those who had climbed another Nepalese peak .

Netherlands 
Amsterdam in 2019 instituted a daily tourist tax and in 2020, eliminated Red Light District tours.

Peru 

As of 2019, Peru limits visitors to Machu Picchu to 5000 per day, but UNESCO believes the limit should be halved. Starting in 2014 foreign tourists were required to hire a guide. In 2020 the site was planning to issue 5,940 tickets per day, which is more than twice the 2,500 UNESCO recommends to preserve the ruins.

Spain 
In Barcelona, protesters have demonstrated in tourist beaches and other tourist-heavy neighborhoods and anti-tourist graffiti has appeared. By 2013, 9,000,000 visitors were touring Park Güell annually, and officials limited entry to the park to 800 an hour. The New Yorker said, "Park Güell’s shift from a shared public space into a cultural zone occupied almost exclusively by tourists is understood by some worried residents of Barcelona as a story about the prospective fate of the city itself." According to Albert Arias, a geographer with the Barcelona government, the selling of tickets was “a very bad solution,” that "is acknowledging a problem by fencing off public space.” Airbnb has contributed to overtourism, with in some sections of town experiencing a 45% decline in resident population between 2007 and 2019 due to investors purchasing properties to use as short-term rentals via the platform. By 2017 tourism had become a top concern among city officials, with a survey showing 60% of residents believed Barcelona had "reached or exceeded" its capacity to accommodate tourism. In 2020 Barcelona was planning to limit cruise ships. In April 2020 a proposal for radical change in the organisation of the city, the Manifesto for the Reorganisation of the City after COVID-19, was published in Barcelona, signed by 160 academics and 300 architects. The Manifesto is radically critical towards the touristification and commodification of the city, proposing to: "eliminate cruise ships", "maintain the current dimensions of the airport", "stimulate touristic degrowth", and "eliminate any investment to promote the 'Barcelona brand'".

Other overtouristed areas in Spain include Mallorca and Alicante.

Thailand 
Maya Bay was closed to the public after overtourism caused environmental issues. Ao Phang Nga National Park was listed in 2017 in Fodor's list of places not to go in 2018 because of overtourism.

United Kingdom 
In Scotland, the Isle of Skye advised visitors not to come unless they had overnight lodging booked.

Vietnam 
In Hanoi in October 2019, a train had to make an emergency stop because of tourists on the tracks taking selfies.

Measures against overtourism 

In September 2018, the World Tourism Organization (UNWTO) published a report on overtourism and how to deal with it. The report highlights the importance of looking at tourism in a local context and details 11 strategies to deal with overtourism:

 Increase the physical dispersion of crowds among different attractions within a city/destination;
 Increase the temporal dispersion of tourists (e.g., by encouraging off-season visits);
 Promote new and special-interest itineraries and attractions;
 Make effective use of regulations on tourism;    
 Tailor activities to specific segments of the tourism market; 
 Ensure that the communities and residents benefit from tourism;
 Create experiences beneficial to both tourists and residents;
 Expand infrastructure;
 Involve local residents in tourism policymaking;
 Communicate with tourists about the potential impacts of tourism on communities;
 Use data to monitor and respond to problems related to overtourism.

The consultancy firm McKinsey suggests that to prevent overtourism one must focus on four priorities:

 Build a comprehensive fact base and update it regularly.
 Establish a sustainable-growth strategy through rigorous, long-term planning.
 Involve all sections of society—commercial, public, and social.
 Find new sources of funding.

In addition, systematic public-relations and communication is essential. Goals, measures, successes and failures of local tourism management must be made transparent to the inhabitants so that all relevant institutions become involved.

See also 
Ecotourism
Impacts of tourism
Pop-culture tourism
Sustainable tourism
Tourist trap
Tourist tax
Tragedy of the commons
Urban vitality

References 

Economy and the environment
Tourism